Jeanneret may refer to:

 Charles Jeanneret (1887–1965), Swiss-French architect better known as Le Corbusier
 Charles Jeanneret (politician) (1834–1898), Australian politician
 François Charles Archile Jeanneret (1890–1967), Canadian academic
 Gustave Jeanneret (1847–1927), Swiss painter
 Henri Jeanneret (1878–1935), Australian footballer
 Pauline Jeanneret (born 1987), French curler
 Pierre Jeanneret (1896–1967), Swiss architect, cousin of Le Corbusier
 Rick Jeanneret (born 1942), Canadian media personality
 Sébastien Jeanneret (born 1973), Swiss footballer